The Newcastle Jesters were an ice hockey franchise based in Newcastle Upon Tyne, England. The team were members of the Ice Hockey Superleague and played their home games at the Telewest Arena (now the Metro Radio Arena).

History

Single Season of Jesters (2000–2001)
The name 'Jesters' was the last of three used by the club during its five-year existence. The franchise was initially known as the Newcastle Cobras between 1996 and 1998. The team was then known as the Newcastle Riverkings for two seasons between 1998 and 2000 before it assumed its final name for the 2000–01 season.

The team featured lots of Finnish players during the teams season as the Jesters. The team had former Jokerit players Tommi Sova and Santeri Immonen, former JYP and Ilves goaltender Tommi Satosaari and Tero Arkiomaa, who was the second best pointscorer during the season. The team was coached by future multiple time world championship winning coach Jukka Jalonen.

At the end of 2000 the Jesters had lost four games in a row, and hired Canadian NHL veteran Bob Halkidis as a defender to boost their flagging fortunes. Mid-February 2001 saw the team at the bottom of the table, one point adrift of Nottingham after five successive defeats including an 8-nil defeat at the hands of Cardiff. By March 2001 it was revealed that the Jesters owed two months unpaid wages to their playing squad, who took legal action against the club. By April 2001 the general manager of the club was in talks to move to Sheffield. The Jesters were subsequently banned by the league from hiring new players due to the non-payment of salaries, but shortly before the start of the 2001-2 season Paul Smith, the chairman of the team, was still insisting that they would be playing that season. The club was then shut down.

Hockey returned to the area with the Newcastle Vipers who joined the British National League in 2002 and then became members of the Elite Ice Hockey League.  The Vipers though folded in 2011.

2000–01 Ice Hockey Superleague Roster

References

Ice hockey teams in England
Sport in Newcastle upon Tyne
Defunct ice hockey teams in the United Kingdom
Ice hockey clubs established in 1996
Sports clubs disestablished in 2001
2001 disestablishments in England